William Gostwick may refer to:

Sir William Gostwick, 1st Baronet (1565–1615), of the Gostwick baronets
Sir William Gostwick, 4th Baronet (1650–1720), of the Gostwick baronets, MP for Bedfordshire
Sir William Gostwick, 5th Baronet (d. 1766), of the Gostwick baronets

See also
Gostwick (surname)